Qaramurad or Karamurad may refer to:
Böyük Qaramurad, Azerbaijan
Kiçik Qaramurad, Azerbaijan